The Google Search Appliance (GSA) was a rack-mounted computer device that provided document indexing functionality.

The GSA operating system was based on CentOS.  The software was produced by Google and the hardware was manufactured by Dell.  The final 2009 GSA version was based on Dell's PowerEdge R710.  Google announced the phase out of the GSA in early 2016 and a complete discontinuation by 2019.

The GSA was supplied in two models: a 2U model (GB-7007) capable of indexing up to 10 million documents, and a 5U (2U plus 3U storage) model (GB-9009) that was capable of indexing up to 30 million documents. Sales were operated on a licensing scheme which started as a two-year contract for maintenance, support and software updates.

Features 
The GSA contained Google search technologies and a means of configuring and customizing the appliance.

Versions 
The GSA was first introduced in 2002.

Software version 6.0 was released in June, 2009.  This software ran on some hardware versions of the GB-1001 model (all units with an "S5" prefix in their "Appliance ID"), and all GB-7007 and GB-9009 models.

Google released version 7.0 on October 9, 2012 and version 7.2 on February 11, 2014.

Models 
The GSA could be purchased in two separate versions based on the number of documents being indexed. Model G100, a 2U appliance, could index up to 20,000,000 documents. The G500 5U appliance could index up to 100,000,000 documents.

Discontinued versions

Older appliances 
Google sold a 2U appliance (GB-1001) capable of indexing up to 5,000,000 documents, a half-rack cluster (GB-5005) of five 2U nodes capable of indexing up to 10,000,000 documents, and a full-rack cluster (GB-8008) of eight and later twelve nodes capable of indexing up to 30,000,000 documents. Some models were based on Dell PowerEdge 2950 2U rackmount servers.

Google Mini 
The Google Mini was a smaller and lower-cost solution that occupied 1U of rack space for small and medium-sized businesses to set up a search engine that allowed them to index and search up to 300,000 documents. The hardware was manufactured byGigabyte Technology then Super Micro Computer, Inc.  The Google Mini was discontinued beginning July 31, 2012.

Google Search Appliance virtual edition for developers 
For a brief period in 2008 Google offered a virtual version of the GSA aimed at developers. The virtual edition could be downloaded free of charge and index up to 50,000 documents. It was soon discontinued for unknown reasons.

Retirement and shutdown 
Early in February 2016, Google sent a confidential letter to its business partners and customers, stating that the GSA would not be available past 2018. It began with the discontinuation of GSA three-year contracts in 2016; in 2017 there would be only one-year renewal contracts and no hardware sales, followed by a complete shutdown in 2018. Customers were expected to migrate to a cloud-based solution.

References

External links 
 Review at SearchTools Analysis
 InfoWorld Review of Google Search Appliance, ISYS:web 8
 Online Example  of a Google Search Appliance at MIT was deprecated as of June 2018.
 Analysis of a second-hand Google Mini Search Appliance.

Enterprise search
Search Appliance
Appliance
Server appliance
Computer-related introductions in 2002
2018 endings